Upper Lake may refer to:

 Populated places
 Upper Lake, California, a census-designated place in Lake County, California, United States

 Lakes
 Upper Lake, Bhopal, former name for the lake in Bhopal, India; now known as Bhojtal.
 Upper Lake in Missoula County, Montana
 Upper Lake in Sanders County, Montana
 Glendalough Upper Lake, in County Wicklow, Ireland